McMurry University is a private Methodist university in Abilene, Texas. It was founded in 1923 and named after William Fletcher McMurry. The university offers forty-five majors in the fields of fine arts, humanities, social and natural sciences, education, business, and religion, and nine pre-professional programs, including nursing, dentistry, medicine, pharmacy, veterinary, and law.

McMurry has 1,145 students. Methodist students constitute 27 percent of the student population. Ninety five percent of students are Texan. Minority groups make up approximately one-fourth of the student body. In the freshman class, 98 percent of students receive some financial aid. Fifty-three percent of students live on campus, and 75 percent of students are involved in at least one extracurricular activity. McMurry boasts a student to faculty ratio of 13:1.

91 percent of the faculty have earned a doctorate or other terminal degree in their field. McMurry is accredited by the Commission on Colleges of the Southern Association of Colleges and Schools, the Texas Education Agency, the University Senate of the United Methodist Church, the National League for Nursing, and the Texas State Board of Nurse Examiners.

Indians mascot controversy
McMurry's sports teams originally used Indians as their mascot. In late August 2005, the National Collegiate Athletic Association (NCAA) handed down a decision calling for the eighteen universities with Native American mascots to change their names or obtain a waiver from their representative tribe for the use of the mascot name. The McMurry Indians were part of this list. The Indians nickname was chosen as a tribute to the University's first president, J.W. Hunt, who grew up on an Indian reservation in the Indian Territory.

On May 18, 2006, the NCAA rejected McMurry's appeal to keep their nickname. The school chose to appeal the ruling, and indicated their intention to do so by the June 18, 2006, deadline. According to a press release, "the University’s appeal will be based on the arbitrariness of the NCAA’s decision-making process and the inconsistent results and messages that have come from the process." Other schools, such as Florida State University, made successful appeals by garnering the endorsement of Indian tribes. Although McMurry did not actively seek an endorsement, representatives from the Kaw, Kiowa, and Comanche tribes voiced their approval of McMurry's mascot. In October 2006, McMurry's Board of Trustees decided that the university would no longer use any names for its athletic teams. Citing the school's 83-year history of honoring Native Americans, the school announced that in spite of no longer using names to designate athletic teams, the school traditions created to honor Native Americans would continue. The school's stadium name was changed from Indian Stadium to Wilford Moore Stadium as of May 13, 2007. Wilford Moore was the most-winning coach in McMurry football history.

On March 11, 2011, it was announced that McMurry University's athletic teams would be known as the War Hawks. The new mascot was chosen after a nearly year-long search to find a new mascot to replace the former Indian mascot. The war hawk is meant to represent pride, courage and fierce competition for McMurry's athletic teams.

Athletics

McMurry's school colors are maroon and white. McMurry fields teams in 19 different intercollegiate sports. For the men, McMurry competes in baseball, basketball, cross country, football, golf, soccer, swimming, tennis, Esports, and indoor and outdoor track and field. For the women, McMurry competes in basketball, cross country, golf, soccer, swimming, tennis, Esports, indoor and outdoor track and field, volleyball, in which they won the NCCAA national championship in 2012, and softball.

All teams played in the NCAA Division III American Southwest Conference until 2011. In July 2011, McMurry announced that it had been accepted as a candidate for NCAA Division II membership and joined the Heartland Conference in the fall of 2012.
The Board of Regent voted in January 2014 to move back to Division III.
The McMurry football team joined the Lone Star Conference in 2014.

McMurry University announced October 19, 2016 that the sport of softball would be added to its women's intercollegiate programs, beginning in 2018. The addition of softball would bring to 20 the number of sports sponsored by the War Hawks. Softball sponsorship in the ASC would grow to 13 teams and becomes the seventh conference championship sport to be supported at every member institution. Women's soccer, men's and women's basketball, men's and women's tennis, and baseball are ASC sports sponsored by all ASC members. By conference rule and with full member sponsorship of softball, the ASC Softball Championship Tournament format would shift to eight-team double-elimination with the 2018 tournament.

Walt Driggers Field
Walt Driggers Field is the home of the McMurry War Hawks collegiate baseball program. The field was designed and built by Anglea Sports Fields, which is headed by former Globe Life Park in Arlington superintendent Jim Anglea. McMurry played its first game at Walt Driggers Field on February 12, 1997 with a 7-3 win against Wayland Baptist Pioneers. The school officially renamed the field before a home game against the Lubbock Christian Chaparrals shortly thereafter.

Notable alumni
 Vernon Asbill, educator and former member of the New Mexico Senate
 V. O. Key, Jr., political scientist
 Jorge Antonio Solis, U.S. federal judge
 Grant Teaff, former head football coach for Baylor University; executive director for the American Football Coaches Association
 Sarah Weddington, U.S. attorney in Roe v. Wade
 Dick Compton, NFL player
 Ernie Park, NFL player
 Brad Rowland, NFL player
Karl Scott, NFL coach
William Arthur Ward, writer
Charlene Holt, actress

Notable faculty
 William Curry Holden, historian and archeologist
 Virgil E. Bottom, experimental physicist and humanitarian

References

External links
 
 Official athletics website

 
Educational institutions established in 1923
Private universities and colleges in Texas
Education in Taylor County, Texas
1923 establishments in Texas
Buildings and structures in Abilene, Texas